Hearts are Trumps is a 1920 American silent drama film directed by Rex Ingram and starring Winter Hall, Frank Brownlee and Alice Terry.

Cast
 Winter Hall as Lord Altcar 
 Frank Brownlee as Michael Wain 
 Alice Terry as Dora Woodberry 
 Francelia Billington as Lady Winifred 
 Joseph Kilgour as Lord Burford 
 Brinsley Shaw as Maurice Felden 
 Thomas Jefferson as Henry Dyson 
 Norman Kennedy as John Gillespie 
 Edward Connelly as Brother Christopher, the Abbot of St. Bernard 
 Bull Montana as Jake 
 Howard Crampton as Butler

References

Bibliography
 Goble, Alan. The Complete Index to Literary Sources in Film. Walter de Gruyter, 1999.

External links

1920 films
1920 drama films
Silent American drama films
Films directed by Rex Ingram
American silent feature films
1920s English-language films
American black-and-white films
Metro Pictures films
American films based on plays
Films set in England
1920s American films